The 1977–78  Gonzaga Bulldogs men's basketball team represented Gonzaga University during the 1977–78 NCAA Division I basketball season. Members of the Big Sky Conference, the Bulldogs were led by 
sixth-year head coach Adrian Buoncristiani and played their home games on campus at Kennedy Pavilion in Spokane, Washington.

Gonzaga was fifth in the regular season standings and did not qualify for the four-team conference tournament.

No Bulldogs were named to the all-conference team; senior guard Jim DeWeese was on the second team, while
junior center Paul Cathey and junior guard Scott Finnie were honorable mention.

Weeks after the conclusion of the season, Buoncristiani was encouraged to resign in April, days before letter of intent  He was succeeded by Dan Fitzgerald, an assistant at Santa Clara; he was an  assistant during ABC's first two years with the Bulldogs and also a teammate from high school (St. Ignatius) in San Francisco.

References

External links
Sports Reference – Gonzaga Bulldogs: 1977–78 basketball season

Gonzaga Bulldogs men's basketball seasons
Gonzaga